Ickes is a surname and may refer to:

Harold Ickes (disambiguation), multiple people, including:
Harold L. Ickes (1874–1952), U.S. Secretary of the Interior in Franklin D. Roosevelt's administration
Harold M. Ickes (born 1939), American deputy White House Chief of Staff during Bill Clinton's administration
Anna Wilmarth Ickes (1873–1935), American activist, politician
Rob Ickes, American dobro (resonator guitar) player.
William Ickes, professor of psychology at the University of Texas at Arlington

See also
Ickes Mountains, Antarctica
Icke